Pedro María Sison (1885–1938) was a senator of the Philippines, judge of the Court of First Instance, a statesman and philanthropist. He was a delegate to the Philippine Constitutional Convention of 1935. 

Sison was born in Urdaneta, Pangasinan on 18 January 1885. His father was Pedro Sison Jr, and his mother was Eusebia Macasieb.

In 1896, at the age of 11, Sison joined his father in fighting the Spaniards during the Philippine Revolution. During the American colonial period, he helped his father restore peace and order in Binalonan and Urdaneta towns.

At the age of 29, Sison was elected to the Philippine Senate. Representing the Second Senatorial District of La Union, Pangasinan, and Zambales, Sison served as a senator during the Fourth Legislature from 1914 to 1916 and whose Senate president was Manuel L. Quezon.

Together with Rafael Palma, Sison sponsored in 1916 a bill on women's suffrage that was approved by the Senate. It was the first time that a bill like that was sponsored.

For his work, he was honored by the cty of Urdaneta in 2008. The city council resolution read:

"It is but fitting and proper that the Balikbayan Park be renamed after the late great senator as an undying gratitude of the city government and the people of Urdaneta City to the family of a native son, a statesman par excellence, a brilliant senator and a philanthropist rolled into one."

On 28 February 1929, he was appointed as an auxiliary judge. The following year, he was promoted as judge of Court of First Instance.

In 1934, he was elected as a delegate to the 1935 Philippine Constitutional Convention.

He married Gracia Palisoc Moran, and their children are Pedro, Carlos, Corazon, Juan, Antonio, Rosario, Armando, Jesus Moran and Gracia.

Sison died on 12 June 1938.

References

External links
Senate of the Philippines

People from Urdaneta, Pangasinan
Politicians from Pangasinan
Senators of the 5th Philippine Legislature
Senators of the 4th Philippine Legislature
1885 births
1938 deaths